Jonathan Angami (formerly Jonathan Yhome) is an Indian singer-songwriter from Nagaland.

Life and career
Jonathan Yhome was born in Kohima, Nagaland to an Angami Naga family. Yhome started his musical career after he first joined the Nagaland Conservatory of Music in 2013. His song titled ‘Something New’ was featured in the 2017 film Nana: A Tale of Us.

References

External links
 Jonathan Yhome on Reverbnation

Naga people
Living people
Year of birth missing (living people)
Indian singer-songwriters
Musicians from Nagaland
People from Kohima